"Come On" is a song and the only single released from The New Power Generation's 1998 album Newpower Soul. Although attributed to the New Power Generation, the song prominently features Prince, as do all songs from the album. The song features Chaka Khan on background vocals. An official video was made, in which Prince humorously disguises himself as an older man, playing jokes with his bandmembers at a park in London, intercut with footage from his Beautiful Strange concert video, filmed at Café de Paris (London).

The maxi single included several remixes of the song and an exclusive disc sold only through Prince's 1-800-NEW-FUNK store also included a remix of Newpower Soul's "The One".

Track listing
Maxi single
 "Come On" (Doug E. Fresh Mix)
 "Come On" (Remix)
 "Come On" (Album Edit)
 "Come On" (Hypermix)
 "Come On" (Latenitemix)
 "Come On" (Acapella)
 "The One" (Remix) only available on 1-800-NEW-FUNK maxi-single

Charts

References
 Uptown: The Vault – The Definitive Guide to the Musical World of Prince: Nilsen Publishing 2004, 

1998 singles
1998 songs
New Power Generation songs
NPG Records singles
Song recordings produced by Prince (musician)
Songs written by Prince (musician)